Csaba Györffy (9 July 1943 – 18 October 2018) was a Romanian footballer who played as a winger.

Career
Csaba Györffy was the one who influenced Steagul Roșu Brașov to change its official colors from white and blue to black and yellow. The change came after in December 1966 Györffy went on a tournament with Romania's Olympic football team in Uruguay. After a match with Peñarol, Györffy received from captain Alberto Spencer the shirt with which he played. Györffy was fascinated by the combination of yellow and black stripes and decided at the return in the country to wear the shirt during his training sessions with the team. The decision to change the colors of the club was taken by coach Silviu Ploeşteanu, who considered that, in the new colors, the team will be seen better on the field. Since January 1967, the team from Brașov has yellow-black as official colors, recalling the Uruguayan Peñarol team. After he retired from his playing career he continued to work at Steagul Roșu Brașov as a manager, assistant and youth coach in different periods. In 2013 he was named Citizen of Honor in Brașov.

International career
Csaba Györffy played one game for Romania's national team under coach Bazil Marian in a 1–1 friendly against Uruguay, which took place in Montevideo on Estadio Gran Parque Central. He also played one game for Romania's Olympic team in which he scored in a 3–2 loss against Denmark at the 1972 Summer Olympics qualifiers. He was selected to be in Romania's 1970 World Cup squad, but because he got ill of bronchitis, Györffy missed the tournament.

Honours
Steagul Roșu Brașov
Divizia B: 1968–69

Notes

References

External links

Csaba Györffy at Labtof.ro

1943 births
2018 deaths
People from Harghita County
Romanian sportspeople of Hungarian descent
Székely people
Romanian footballers
Romania international footballers
Association football forwards
Liga I players
Liga II players
ASA Târgu Mureș (1962) players
FC Brașov (1936) players
Romanian football managers
FC Brașov (1936) managers